Lisa Wenger (born Lisa Ruutz :23 January 1858 – 17 October 1941) was a Swiss painter and author of children's books.   During the 1930s  she was one of the best known and most widely read authors in the country.

Life 
Lisa Ruutz was born in Bern.   Heinrich Ruutz, her father, owned a fabrics and textiles shop in Basel.   She undertook artistic training successively in Basel, Paris and Florence, finishing off at the Fine Arts Academy in Düsseldorf.  Her teachers in Basel, included Hans Sandreuter.   In 1881 Lisa Ruutz opened a porcelain painting workshop, targeted on women and young ladies in Basel.

In 1890 she married Théo Wenger, the owner of a "steel goods" factory.   That involved relocating to Delémont which at the time was still in the Canton of Bern (although the call for cantonal borders that more closely reflected language frontiers was already a longstanding cause of agitation).  It was only on reaching the age of 46, after establishing herself at nearby Courtételle, that she embarked on the career for which she is today better remembered, as a children's author.

After 1919 Lisa and Théo Wenger became regular visitors to Carona (Lugano) in Ticino, members of the little informal summer season writers and artists' colony surrounding the author Hermann Hesse who moved to Lugano after the war.    Their daughter Ruth Wenger (1897-1994) became a particularly welcome guest at the "Casa Costanza" (identified in less respectful sources as "the parrot house").   Eventually, in 1924, Ruth Wenger married Hermann Hesse.   Ruth was twenty years younger than her husband and her first marriage was of short duration:  the family attachment to Ticino appears to have lasted better, since it was at Carona that Lisa Wenger died in the autumn/fall of 1941.

Published output (selection) 

 Das blaue Märchenbuch 1905
 Wie der Wald still ward, animal story 1906
 Joggeli söll ga Birli schüttle, 1908
 Prüfungen, novel 1908
 Die Wunderdoktorin, novel 1909
 Der Kampf um die Kanzel, short story 1911
 Amoralische Fabeln, 1920
 Baum ohne Blätter, 1938
 Das Zeichen. Ein Schauspiel in drei Akten, 1914
 Der Garten. Erzählungen aus dem Tessin, 1924
 Der Vogel im Käfig, novel 1922
 Der Waldfrevler, 1919
 Die Altweibermühle. Zehn Frauenmärchen, 1921
 Die drei gescheiten Männer von Au. Vetter Jeremias and die Schwestern Tanzeysen., novels 1919
 Die Longway und ihre Ehen., novel 1930
 Die Wunderdoktorin, novel 1910
 Eine Heimkehr
 Elisabeth sucht Gott, 1941
 Er und Sie und das Paradies, 1918
 Es schwärs Warte. Einakter, 1930
 Hans-Peter Ochsner., novel 1955
 Licht und Schatten in San Marto, novel 1940
 Oh wie bös, oh nit so bös: die Geschichte vom Mannli und vom Fraueli, 1946
 s Zeiche: ein Schauspiel in drei Akten, 1916
 Verenas Hochzeit, 1939
 Vier junge Musikanten erleben Abenteuer. Zeichnungen von Fritz Deringer. Schweizerisches Jugendschriftenwerk 1940, SJW-Issue Nr. 88
 Was mich das Leben lehrte: Gedanken und Erfahrungen, 1927
 Wie der Wald still ward, 1907
 Aber, aber Kristinli. Schweizerisches Jugendschriftenwerk 1935, SJW-Issue Nr. 48, Jubiläumsausgabe-Reprint 2006 with illustrations by Meret Oppenheim,

References

This article was initially translated from the German Wikipedia.

External links
 

1858 births
1941 deaths
19th-century Swiss painters
20th-century Swiss painters
20th-century Swiss women writers
Artists from Bern
20th-century Swiss novelists
20th-century short story writers
Swiss women short story writers
Swiss short story writers
Swiss women painters
Swiss women novelists
Swiss writers in German
20th-century Swiss women artists
19th-century Swiss women artists